Columnea hirta is a species of flowering plants in the genus Columnea. They are endemic to Costa Rica and Panama but are widely cultivated as an ornamental.

Description
Their trailing stems are covered with small red hairs. Their velvety leaves are dark green in color and ovate in shape. The profuse tubular flowers are orange to red-orange in color.

Distribution and habitat
Columnea hirta is epiphytic. They are endemic to Costa Rica and Panama but are widely cultivated as an ornamental.

Taxonomy
Columnea hirta was first described by the German botanists Johann Friedrich Klotzsch and Johannes von Hanstein in 1865. It is classified under the genus Columnea of the family Gesneriaceae.

References

hirta
Flora of Costa Rica
Flora of Panama